Rongotai is a suburb of Wellington, New Zealand, located southeast of the city centre. It is on the Rongotai isthmus, between the Miramar Peninsula and the suburbs of Kilbirnie and Lyall Bay. It is known mostly for being the location of the Wellington International Airport. It is roughly in the centre of the Rongotai electorate, which is much bigger than the suburb.

History
Until about the 15th century, the Rongotai isthmus was probably a shallow channel known as Te Awa a Tia. The only part of the current isthmus above water was the small hill which now has the airport control tower on it; the Miramar Peninsula was an island known as Te Motu Kairangi at the entrance to Wellington Harbour. Māori oral history describes a massive earthquake known as Haowhenua ("land swallower" or "land destroyer") which raised the seabed so that it became possible to wade across to Miramar. Following the earthquake, the seabed seems to have silted up, creating a sandflat which linked Miramar to the mainland, at least at low tide. When James Cook entered Wellington Harbour in 1773 he found the former channel impassable by boat.

In 1855, another earthquake further lifted the isthmus so that it became permanently dry land. The southern half remained mostly sand dunes, but houses were built on the northern end, as was a coal-fired power station  and Rongotai College. In 1939-1940 Rongotai became the site of the 1940 New Zealand Centennial Exhibition, which attracted more than 2.5 million people. The coal-fired power station was later closed and the site is now occupied by a fire station.

Since the early twentieth century, the dunes had been used as a runway for light aircraft. By World War II a more permanent airfield had been built, and was used by the Royal New Zealand Air Force, who also took over the centennial buildings after the close of the exhibition. On 24 October 1959 Wellington's international airport was opened, the runway and associated buildings taking over the entire eastern half of the suburb. In the process of building the airport,  of land was reclaimed and 180 houses were moved. Light industry and a Rongotai College playing field occupied most of the south-west quarter of the suburb. The north-west quarter continued to be residential apart from the college and a few corner shops. In the early 2000s the industrial section of Rongotai was transformed when an old warehouse was turned into a retail park centring on a large branch of The Warehouse (a discount store). Traffic in the area has increased dramatically.

Demographics 

Rongotai had a population of 48 at the 2018 New Zealand census, a decrease of 15 people (-23.8%) since the 2013 census, and a decrease of 15 people (-23.8%) since the 2006 census. There were 24 households. There were 24 males and 24 females, giving a sex ratio of 1.0 males per female. The median age was 44.4 years (compared with 37.4 years nationally), with 3 people (6.2%) aged under 15 years, 9 (18.8%) aged 15 to 29, 27 (56.2%) aged 30 to 64, and 6 (12.5%) aged 65 or older.

Ethnicities were 75.0% European/Pākehā, 6.2% Māori, 12.5% Asian, and 12.5% other ethnicities (totals add to more than 100% since people could identify with multiple ethnicities).

The proportion of people born overseas was 31.2%, compared with 27.1% nationally.

Although some people objected to giving their religion, 43.8% had no religion, 25.0% were Christian, 12.5% were Hindu and 12.5% had other religions.

Of those at least 15 years old, 9 (20.0%) people had a bachelor or higher degree, and 6 (13.3%) people had no formal qualifications. The median income was $42,500, compared with $31,800 nationally. The employment status of those at least 15 was that 21 (46.7%) people were employed full-time, 12 (26.7%) were part-time, and 6 (13.3%) were unemployed.

Education

Rongotai College is a single-sex (boys) state secondary school for Year 9 to 13 students, founded in 1928. Girls living in the Rongotai area are zoned to attend Wellington East Girls' College or Wellington High School.

References

Suburbs of Wellington City
Cook Strait
Populated places around the Wellington Harbour